Hazel Creek may refer to:

Hazel Creek (Soque River), a stream in Georgia
Hazel Creek (Courtois Creek), a stream in Missouri
Hazel Creek (Littleby Creek), a stream in Missouri
Hazel Creek (Great Smoky Mountains), a stream in North Carolina
Hazel Creek (Lehigh River), a stream in Pennsylvania